Shotor Mel or Shotormel or Shotor Mol may refer to:

Shotor Mol, Kurdistan
Shotor Mel, Lorestan
Shotor Mel-e Olya-ye Rahmat, Lorestan